Late Meeting is a 1979 romantic drama television film based on the novel Urgently Required Gray human hair by Yuri Nagibin.

Plot 
The film takes place in Leningrad and Sverdlovsk, in 1970 and 1979.

Arriving on a business trip from Sverdlovsk in the Lenfilm, engineer catapults Sergei Gushchin meets a young actress Natasha. She invites him to show Leningrad, but Gushchin and he knows the city - he served here during the war. They are looking for an excuse for further meetings, but he always finds a reason to not to meet with the woman who is many years younger than him and with whom he has fallen in love with. Natasha understands too that she loves this man, but Gushchin leaves, and not daring to associate with her fate. In the end he leaves and only returns to Leningrad nine years later and then he tries to find Natasha again.

Cast 
Alexey Batalov as Sergey Ivanovich Gushchin
Margarita Volodina as Masha, Gushin's wife 
 Tatyana Dogileva as daughter
Larisa Luppian as Natasha Proskurova
 Mikhail Gluzsky as Pyotr Sviridonsky
 Vladimir Tatosov as Vasily Mikhailovich Belyakov, painter
 Sergey Filippov as Sergey, an actor at the studio

References

External links

1979 films
1979 romantic drama films
Soviet romantic drama films
Russian romantic drama films
Films based on works by Yuri Nagibin
Soviet television films
Films set in Saint Petersburg
Films set in the Soviet Union